The 2011 Cooper Tires British Formula 3 International Series (an international motor racing series), was the 61st British Formula 3 International Series season. The season began on 16 April at Monza in Italy and ended on 9 October at Silverstone after 30 races held at ten meetings. Of those meetings, six were held in the United Kingdom, with overseas rounds at Monza, the Nürburgring in Germany, Paul Ricard in France, and Spa in Belgium.

Brazilian driver Felipe Nasr dominated the series, winning seven races and recording 16 top three finishes over the first eight rounds of the series, putting him 123 points ahead of Nasr's Carlin Motorsport teammate, Danish driver Kevin Magnussen, giving him an unassailable lead in the championship with two rounds still in hand.

Regulation changes
A number of changes were announced for the season, with pit-stops set to be introduced in the third race of each round, but this plan was later abandoned in July 2011. The championship's class system – Championship and National – was also renamed to the International and Rookie Championships. The Rookie winner will receive a fully paid entry to the 2012 International Championship.

Drivers and teams

Driver changes
 Changed Teams
 William Buller will change teams for his second season in British F3 moving from Hitech Racing to Fortec Motorsport. Lucas Foresti will also join Fortec Motorsport, having completed his rookie season with Carlin.
 After driving for Räikkönen Robertson Racing in 2010, Carlos Huertas and Felipe Nasr will join Carlin.
 After three seasons with his family-run CF Racing outfit, Hywel Lloyd will move to Sino Vision Racing to partner Adderly Fong.

 Entering/Re-Entering British Formula 3 International Series
 After finishing runner-up to Robin Frijns in Formula BMW Europe, Jack Harvey moved to Carlin. Another Formula BMW Europe graduate, Fahmi Ilyas competed with Fortec Motorsport.
 Kevin Magnussen and Pipo Derani moved from the Motopark Academy team that competed in German F3 to compete in the championship. Magnussen drove for Carlin, while Derani raced for Double R Racing.
 Formula Three Sudamericana champion Yann Cunha moved into the series full-time and partnered National class champion Menasheh Idafar at T-Sport. Cunha competed at the second Silverstone meeting with CF Racing in 2010.
 After two seasons in Formula Renault UK, Harry Tincknell competed for Fortec Motorsport.
 Bart Hylkema moved into the series from the Formula Renault Eurocup, to compete in the secondary Rookie Cup for T-Sport. He was joined in the Rookie Cup by Kotaro Sakurai, who moved from the now-defunct Formula BMW Pacific series to compete for Hitech Racing.
 Pietro Fantin moved into the series from Formula Three Sudamericana. He will compete for Hitech Racing, the team he raced for in three meetings in 2010 when he was competing in the Invitation Class. He was joined by Formula Renault UK race-winner Riki Christodoulou, who returned to the championship after a season's absence, and Bruno Méndez, who competed in Formula Renault 3.5 in 2010.
 British Formula Ford champion Scott Pye moved into the championship, driving for Double R Racing.

 Leaving British Formula Three
 After contesting a part season in Formula Renault 3.5 for Tech 1 Racing outwith commitments in British F3, 2010 champion Jean-Éric Vergne moved into the series full-time with Carlin. Third-placed Oliver Webb and ninth-placed Daniel McKenzie also moved into the series for Pons Racing and Comtec Racing respectively.
 Runner-up in 2010 James Calado moved into the GP3 Series with ART Grand Prix.
 Daisuke Nakajima returned to his native Japan to compete in Formula Nippon, having finished in eleventh place for Räikkönen Robertson Racing.
 Alex Brundle returned to FIA Formula Two Championship, having competed in the series' inaugural season in 2009. He was joined by Max Snegirev and National Class runner-up James Cole.

Race calendar and results
 A provisional ten-round calendar was announced on 16 October 2010, before this was altered again on 26 November 2010. The Nürburgring meeting was moved from September to July on 4 February 2011. The first and third races at the Spa-Francorchamps round were also points-scoring for the FIA Formula 3 International Trophy.

 1 Fastest lap recorded by Roberto Merhi, but he was ineligible to score the fastest lap point.
 2 Fastest lap recorded by Hannes van Asseldonk, but he was ineligible to score the fastest lap point.

Championship standings

References

External links
 The official website of the British Formula 3 Championship

British Formula Three Championship seasons
Formula Three season
British
British Formula 3 Championship